Fissocantharis is a genus of soldier beetle belonging to the family Cantharidae. It is one of the largest genera of cantharid beetles, with about 200 species known worldwide and new species discovered in every year.

In China, more than 100 species recognized. About 30 species identified from Taiwan, where all of them are endemic, except one species, F. mucronata.

Selected species
 Fissocantharis acuticollis
 Fissocantharis angusta
 Fissocantharis basilaris
 Fissocantharis bicolorata
 Fissocantharis bidifformis
 Fissocantharis bifoveatus
 Fissocantharis bimaculata
 Fissocantharis biprojicientis
 Fissocantharis buonloiensis
 Fissocantharis cicatricosa
 Fissocantharis denominata
 Fissocantharis eschara
 Fissocantharis fissa
 Fissocantharis flava
 Fissocantharis flavicornis
 Fissocantharis flavimembris
 Fissocantharis flavipennis
 Fissocantharis gracilipes
 Fissocantharis grahami
 Fissocantharis guizhouensis
 Fissocantharis hainana
 Fissocantharis imparicornis
 Fissocantharis kontumensis
 Fissocantharis laticollis
 Fissocantharis laticornis
 Fissocantharis latipalpa
 Fissocantharis liuchowensis
 Fissocantharis maculiceps
 Fissocantharis maculicollis
 Fissocantharis multiexcavata
 Fissocantharis nigriceps
 Fissocantharis novemexcavatus
 Fissocantharis novemoblonga
 Fissocantharis pallidiceps
 Fissocantharis paulioincrassata
 Fissocantharis pieli
 Fissocantharis safranekimima
 Fissocantharis securiclata
 Fissocantharis semifumata
 Fissocantharis semimetallica
 Fissocantharis septangula
 Fissocantharis sexcostata
 Fissocantharis similis
 Fissocantharis sinensis
 Fissocantharis sinensomima
 Fissocantharis tachulanensis
 Fissocantharis tridifformis
 Fissocantharis walteri
 Fissocanthais yui

References

Beetles of Asia
Cantharidae